Afeaki is a surname. Notable people with the surname include:

Ben Afeaki (born 1988), New Zealand rugby union player
Inoke Afeaki (born 1973), Tongan rugby union player
Stanley Afeaki (born 1978), New Zealand-born Tongan rugby union player

See also
Emeline Afeaki-Mafile'o, New Zealand activist

Tongan-language surnames